Acacia campylophylla is a shrub of the genus Acacia and the subgenus Plurinerves that is endemic to a part of south western Australia.

Description
Like most species of Acacia it has phyllodes than true leaves. These Phyllodes are continuous along the length of the branchlets but not forming cauline wings and are strongly recurved. It blooms from July to August and produces yellow flowers.

Taxonomy
The species was first formally described by the botanist George Bentham in 1855 as part of the work Plantae Muellerianae: Mimosea as published in the journal Linnaea. It was reclassified as Racosperma campylophyllum by Leslie Pedley in 2003 then transferred back to genus Acacia in 2006.

Distribution
It is native to an area in the Wheatbelt  region of Western Australia where it is commonly found growing in gravelly lateritic soils. It has a scattered distribution from around Bolgart and Wyalkatchem in the north down to around Corrigin in the south around laterite outcrops as a part of woodland or heath communities.

See also
 List of Acacia species

References

campylophylla
Acacias of Western Australia
Taxa named by George Bentham
Plants described in 1855